Gaby Jallo (born 1 January 1989 in Qamishli) is an Aramean-Dutch footballer who last played as a left back for Dutch FC Emmen. He previously played for Heracles Almelo and Willem II.

Honours

Club
Willem II
Eerste Divisie (1): 2013–14

References

External links
 
 Voetbal International profile 

Living people
1989 births
Dutch people of Assyrian/Syriac descent
Dutch people of Syrian descent
People from Qamishli
Association football fullbacks
Syrian footballers
Syrian Christians
Syrian expatriate footballers
Dutch footballers
Heracles Almelo players
FC Twente players
Willem II (football club) players
FC Emmen players
Eredivisie players
Assyrian footballers